Zenti may refer to:
 Zenti (river), in the Basketo special woreda of Ethiopia
 Girolamo Zenti (c. 1609 – c. 1666), Italian harpsichord maker
 Giuseppe Zenti (b. 1947), Catholic bishop

See also 
 Centi-